Mosiula Faasuka Tatupu (April 26, 1955 – February 23, 2010) was an American professional football player who was a running back for 14 seasons in the National Football League (NFL). He played college football at the University of Southern California (USC). He played in the NFL as a running back and on special teams with New England Patriots from 1978 to 1990 and the Los Angeles Rams in 1991. He was elected to the Pro Bowl in 1986. He became a football coach after his playing career.

High school career
Tatupu was a standout player at Punahou School in Honolulu, where he set many Hawaii state rushing records. He graduated in 1974.

College career
Tatupu attended the University of Southern California, playing in the 1978 Hula Bowl and finished his career with 223 rushing attempts for 1277 yards (5.73 yards per attempt avg.). The , given annually to the College Football Special Teams Player of the Year by the Maui Quarterback Club and the Hula Bowl, bears his name.

NFL career
Drafted in eighth round with the 215th overall pick of the 1978 NFL Draft by the New England Patriots, Tatupu played fullback and became an ace on special teams. He rushed the ball 612 times for 2,415 yards and 18 touchdowns; in the 1983 season he led the league with 5.5 rushing yards per attempt.  He caught 96 passes for 843 yards and two touchdowns for his career.  His season high for rushing yards came in 1983 with 578 rushing yards and four touchdowns, while in 1984 he set a personal best with 16 catches for 159 yards. In 1987 against the Los Angeles Raiders, Tatupu threw a 15-yard touchdown to Tony Collins. However, the Patriots were terrible late in his career (they went 1–15 in his final season) and his playing time was sharply reduced in his final three years with the team; in one instance, Chris Berman mined humor from a blowout New England loss by showing all 13 receptions by Tatupu in the game, because none of the catches produced a touchdown or even a first down.

Tatupu was used mostly on special teams kick coverage. He had seven kick returns for 56 yards in his career.

Coaching career and death
Tatupu was the head coach at King Philip Regional High School in Wrentham, Massachusetts from 1995 to 2001, compiled a record of 29–43 in seven seasons. Former New England Patriots center, Pete Brock, was one of his assistant coaches. Tatupu was the running backs coach at Curry College, an NCAA Division III school in Milton, Massachusetts, from 2002 to 2007, serving under head coach Steve Nelson, a former teammate of Tatupu on the Patriots.

Tatupu died in Plainville, Massachusetts on February 23, 2010. The cause of death was a heart attack. In 2014, using brain tissue preserved from his 2010 autopsy, he was posthumously diagnosed with chronic traumatic encephalopathy by the CTE Center at Boston University School of Medicine.

Family
Tatupu's son, Lofa Tatupu, played linebacker at USC and for the Seattle Seahawks. Lofa was a teammate of Matt Hasselbeck, the son of Mosi's teammate with the Patriots, Don Hasselbeck. His nephew, Joe Tuipala, was also an NFL linebacker from 1999 to 2005.

In pop culture
In the Halloween 1992 episode of The Simpsons entitled "Treehouse of Horror III", Tatupu's name is used during the "King Homer" segment, which parodies the 1933 film King Kong. During the segment, the chief of Ape Island is shown to say "Mosi Tatupu, Mosi Tatupu", which in their language means "the blue-haired woman will make a fine sacrifice"—the "blue-haired woman" being Marge Simpson, who is playing Fay Wray's Ann Darrow to Homer's King Kong.

One of the most popular players to play for the New England Patriots, Tatupu had his own section of fans at Foxboro Stadium, "Mosi's Mooses," who all adorned moose heads and chanted his name throughout the game.

References

External links
 

1955 births
2010 deaths
American football running backs
Curry Colonels football coaches
Los Angeles Rams players
New England Patriots players
USC Trojans football players
High school football coaches in Massachusetts
American Conference Pro Bowl players
Punahou School alumni
People from Pago Pago
Players of American football from Honolulu
Players of American football from American Samoa
American sportspeople of Samoan descent
American football players with chronic traumatic encephalopathy